FC Skala 1911 Stryi was a Ukrainian football team. The team is based in Stryi, Ukraine.

History
Over the years there were several clubs connected with Skala Stryi starting from 1911.

Club of Austria-Hungary and Poland
The first recorded match in Stryi was at times of Austria-Hungary, so called Kingdom of Galicia and Lodomeria on 29 June 1906 when a team of Stryj gymnasium (high school) lost to a team from Lemberg (Lviv). The next year (1907) in Stryj was established Studencki Klub Sportowy which soon was renamed as KS Pogon Stryj.

Starting from around 1910 there started to appear number of football teams in the city of Stryi: Pogon (Polish), Hakoah (Jewish), Sich (Ukrainian). Sich that was created in 1911 was the predecessor of Skala. The president of Sich became well known Ukrainian composer Ostap Nyzhankivsky. Due to the fact that name Sich can be very politically offensive towards Polish nationals, the name was changed to Skala in 1912 as USC Skala. As a word Skala is an obsolete form of another word Skelia and it is also used in the Russian language. However soon after 1912 the club disappeared. Some players joined the SSC Pogon Stryj, others discontinued to play football. During the World War I there was no sport life in Stryi. During the Ukrainian-Polish War, Poles killed Ostap Nyzhankivsky in 1919.

In 1922 the football team Skala Stryi was revived as a section of the Gymnastic Association Sokil. Sokil was a member of the Ukrainian Sports Union which however refused to cooperate with the Polish authorities therefore the Ukrainian teams were banned from the Polish competitions. In 1925 Skala Stryi became an independent organization and a member of the Ukrainian Sports Union. Starting from 1928 the Ukrainian football clubs started to join the Lviv District Football Union. The first team that joined the union was the Sports Association Ukraine. In 1931 Skala also followed that example. In 1933 however the club left the Lviv District Football Union and returned to the Ukrainian Sports Union. In 1936 Skala once again joined the Polish Football Federation. There was created the new Stanislawow District Football Union and all clubs from Stryi were initially transferred to it. However due to difficult transportation communications with the rest of the Stanislawow Voivodeship, the city clubs petitioned to stay with the Lviv District Football Union.

Skala Stryi (Karpaty Kamianka-Buzka)
The football club Skala was revived in 1989 with some support from public and the Stryi city sports committee headed by Vasyl Kokhanchyk as well as part of the drive for the Ukrainian national revival (so called "National Revival Wave"). The first president became Volodymyr Buriy who was assisted by Mykola Zelinsky (associated with FC Medyk Morshyn). In the beginning the newly created club played in competitions of the Lviv Oblast championship.

Following dissolution of the Soviet Union and creation of independent Ukrainian football championship, in 1992 FC Karpaty Kamianka-Buzka, club of the 1991 Soviet Second League B, was admitted to the 1992 Ukrainian First League, but due to difficult financial situation decided to withdraw. The Stryi club played its first game against FC Zakarpattia Uzhhorod hosting it in Stryi and tying the match at 0. The season Skala finished with 31 points tying for the 4th place along with Zakarpattia and FC Ros Bila Tserkva. The club's best scorer in 1992 became Vasyl Kardash with 6 goals.

Hazovyk-Skala Stryi (Hazovyk Komarno)

Later in 2001 the city of Stryi received a new team that relocated from Komarno, FC Hazovyk Komarno. The club was reorganized once again when its main football team relocated to Stryi. It was renamed as Hazovyk-Khurtovyna adding a name of the former Ukrainian club that existed in Komarno prior to the Soviet invasion of Halychyna in 1939. In 2004 this team under the name of FC Hazovyk-Skala Stryi won the Druha Liha Group A championship and was promoted to the Ukrainian First League. Then the team became financially distressed after the 2005/06 season and was bought by the Ukrainian insurance company "Kniazha". They moved again and now to Lviv changing its name to FC Lviv.

Skala Stryi (Morshyn)

Skala 1911 Stryi

Honors

Ukrainian Second League
Winners: 2003–04 (Group "A")

League and cup history

As Skala Stryi
Soviet Union as Karpaty Kamyanka-Buzka
{|class="wikitable"
|-bgcolor="#efefef"
! Season
! Div.
! Pos.
! Pl.
! W
! D
! L
! GS
! GA
! P
!Domestic Cup
!colspan=2|Europe
!Notes
|-
|align=center|1991
|align=center|4th "I"
|align=center|16
|align=center|50
|align=center|15
|align=center|15
|align=center|20
|align=center|48
|align=center|55
|align=center|45
|align=center|
|align=center|
|align=center|
|align=center|Renamed in SkalaRelocated to Stryi
|}

Ukraine
{|class="wikitable"
|-bgcolor="#efefef"
! Season
! Div.
! Pos.
! Pl.
! W
! D
! L
! GS
! GA
! P
!Domestic Cup
!colspan=2|Europe
!Notes
|-
|align=center|1992
|align=center|2nd "B"
|align=center|6
|align=center|26
|align=center|11
|align=center|9
|align=center|6
|align=center|39
|align=center|24
|align=center|31
|align=center|1/8 finals
|align=center|
|align=center|
|align=center|
|-
|align=center|1992–93
|align=center|2nd
|align=center|11
|align=center|42
|align=center|15
|align=center|11
|align=center|16
|align=center|49
|align=center|58
|align=center|41
|align=center|1/64 finals
|align=center|
|align=center|
|align=center|
|-
|align=center|1993–94
|align=center|2nd
|align=center|16
|align=center|38
|align=center|11
|align=center|17
|align=center|20
|align=center|36
|align=center|48
|align=center|29
|align=center|1/16 finals
|align=center|
|align=center|
|align=center|
|-
|align=center|1994–95
|align=center|2nd
|align=center|19
|align=center|42
|align=center|12
|align=center|9
|align=center|21
|align=center|31
|align=center|65
|align=center|45
|align=center|1/64 finals
|align=center|
|align=center|
|align=center|
|-
|align=center|1995–96
|align=center|2nd
|align=center|22
|align=center|42
|align=center|2
|align=center|3
|align=center|37
|align=center|21
|align=center|108
|align=center|9
|align=center|1/64 finals
|align=center|
|align=center|
|align=center bgcolor=red|RelegatedSkala dissolved
|-
|}

As Hazovyk-Skala Stryi

{|class="wikitable"
|-bgcolor="#efefef"
! Season
! Div.
! Pos.
! Pl.
! W
! D
! L
! GS
! GA
! P
!Domestic Cup
!colspan=2|Europe
!Notes
|-
|align=center|-2001
|align=center colspan=13|Refer to FC Hazovyk Komarno
|-
|align=center|2001–02
|align=center|3rd "A"
|align=center|10
|align=center|36
|align=center|12
|align=center|11
|align=center|13
|align=center|31
|align=center|38
|align=center|47
|align=center|2nd Round
|align=center|
|align=center|
|align=center|as Hazovyk-Skala Stryi
|-
|align=center|2002–03
|align=center|3rd "A"
|align=center|9
|align=center|28
|align=center|8
|align=center|9
|align=center|11
|align=center|15
|align=center|23
|align=center|33
|align=center|1/32 finals
|align=center|
|align=center|
|align=center|
|-
|align=center|2003–04
|align=center|3rd "A"
|align=center bgcolor=gold|1
|align=center|30
|align=center|18
|align=center|11
|align=center|1
|align=center|46
|align=center|15
|align=center|65
|align=center|1/16 finals
|align=center|
|align=center|
|align=center bgcolor=green|Promoted
|-
|align=center|2004–05
|align=center|2nd
|align=center|12
|align=center|34
|align=center|12
|align=center|7
|align=center|15
|align=center|34
|align=center|39
|align=center|43
|align=center|1/32 finals
|align=center|
|align=center|
|align=center|
|-
|align=center|2005–06
|align=center|2nd
|align=center|6
|align=center|34
|align=center|14
|align=center|10
|align=center|10
|align=center|35
|align=center|33
|align=center|52
|align=center|1/8 finals
|align=center|
|align=center|
|align=center|Club moved to LvivRenamed FC Lviv
|-
|align=center|2006–
|align=center colspan=13|Refer to FC Lviv
|-
|}

Officials
 Volodymyr Buriy (Skala)
 Anatoliy Barabasevych (Skala)
 Bohdan Kobryn (Skala)

 Volodymyr Fek (Hazovyk-Skala)
 Oleksandr Didenko (Hazovyk-Skala, vice-president)
 Rostyslav Zaremba (Hazovyk-Skala, sports director)

Managers
 1989-1991 Mykhailo Vilkhovyi (Karpaty Kamianka-Buzka)
 1991-1991 Volodymyr Zhuravchak (Karpaty Kamianka-Buzka)

 1991-1991 Valentyn Khodukin
 1992-1992 Mykhailo Vilkhovyi
 1992-1993 Andriy Karimov
 1993-1993 Yuriy Shulyatytskyi
 1993-1994 Yuriy Smierdov
 1994-1994 Mykhailo Vilkhovyi
 1994-1994 Yuriy Smierdov
 1995-1995 Roman Pokora
 1996-1996 Yuriy Shulyatytskyi

 1997-2001 Yuriy Dubrovnyi (coached FC Hazovyk Komarno)
 2002-2003 Vyacheslav Mavrov
 2003-2006 Bohdan Bandura

References

 
Defunct football clubs in Ukraine
1911 establishments in Austria-Hungary
1992 establishments in Ukraine
2009 disestablishments in Ukraine
Football clubs in Stryi
Ukrainian association football clubs outside Ukraine
Association football clubs established in 1911
Association football clubs established in 1992
Association football clubs disestablished in 2009
Sports team relocations